Metaludios is a collection of piano pieces written by Spanish composer and pianist Gustavo Díaz-Jerez.

History
The composition of the Metaludios started in 2013 following a commission from Spanish pianist Marta Zabaleta.  As of 2021, a total of thirty Metaludios have been published, grouped in books of six pieces, totalling five books.  The word Metaludio is derived from the prefix meta-, “beyond” and the suffix -ludio, from the Latin ludēre, “to play”, “to exercise”.

Style 
The Metaludios belong to the contemporary classical music genre. Like other works by the composer, they use scientific models from which musical material is derived. These include fractal images, cellular automata, L-Systems, numerical sequences, Artificial Intelligence, etc. Other sources of inspiration include literature and mythology. Some Metaludios are written as hommages to concrete artists (Antonio Soler, Brahms, Antonio José, Gesualdo, Martín Chirino, etc.).  Many employ extended techniques and electronics.  Psychoacoustics and the search of new sonorities to extend the expressive palette of the piano is central to the composition of these pieces.

Recordings
Books I-V of Metaludios have been recorded on CD for Spanish record label IBS Classical, featuring the composer at the piano.  A first CD, containing Books I-III appeared in 2018. A second CD, containing Books IV and V, was published in 2021.

Reception
The Metaludios have received excellent reviews both in Spain and abroad.

British music critic David McDade compares the Metaludios with the Ligeti études, suggesting they could be their successors:

Spanish composer and music critic Tomás Marco wrote:

Miguel Ángel Pérez Martín, in his review titled The piano of the future? for Docenotas music magazine, writes:

Table of pieces

References

External links
 Metaludios official webpage

Experimental music compositions
Contemporary classical compositions
Compositions for solo piano
Spanish compositions for solo piano